Lallo may refer to:

 Lallo, nickname of Spencer Asah, American Kiowa painter
 Anthony Di Lallo, Belgian footballer
 Lallo Gori, Italian composer and musician
 Moose Lallo, nickname of Morris G. Lallo, Canadian ice hockey player and coach
 Richard DiLallo, American author
 Lallo Peshawa, Kurdish, Norwegian producer

See also
 Lalo (disambiguation)